Russell Clifford "Cliff" Durant (November 26, 1890 – October 31, 1937) was an American racecar driver.  He was the son of William C. Durant, the founder of General Motors and Durant's first wife, Clara Pitt.  Cliff Durant had four wives: Lena Pearl McFarland, Adelaide Pearl Frost, Lea Gapsky, and Charlotte Phillips.  His second wife, Adelaide Pearl Frost (1885–1977), whom he married on September 1, 1911, was a singing star who later married WW1 fighting ace Eddie Rickenbacker.

Early life
Durant was born in Flint, Michigan, the son of William C. Durant and Clara Miller Pitt.  His older sister, Margery Durant, was three years his senior.  In 1900, the family lived at 704 Garland Street in Flint and were attended by servants.  Durant went to Flint grammar schools and later the University of Detroit and the Pennsylvania Military Academy.  In 1908, his parents divorced and in the divorce settlement, Durant's mother, Clara, was granted the house on Garland Street.

Married life
Durant had a number of marriages and was rumored to treat his wives poorly through extramarital affairs and physical abuse.

Racing activities

Santa Monica 1919 
In 1919 Durant was named the "Pacific Coast Champion," when he drove a blue Chevrolet Special to victory at the Santa Monica Road Race. He averaged  in the open topped machine for a total of 3 hours and 4 minutes. His teammate Eddie Hearne finished only 7 minutes behind Durant. Durant only pitted twice, for tire changes. One of those pit stops was for a tire that blew while he was running almost .

Beverly Hills Speedway 

Durant was a co-owner of the Beverly Hills Speedway (1920–1924), a  board track, along with the Speedway Association, which was owned by Durant, Cecil B. DeMille, Jake Dansinger and Silsbee Spalding, among others.  It is located where the Beverly Wilshire Hotel is today.

In its day it rivaled the Indianapolis Motor Speedway for speed.  In May 1923 Durant shattered eight world speed records for events  and under at the Beverly Hills Speedway.

Detroit Special 
Early in 1927, Durant financed the design and construction of an 8-cylinder front-wheel drive vehicle, designed and built by C. W. Van Ranst and Tommy Milton.  The vehicle was assembled in a basement laboratory of the General Motors Building in Detroit and, as such, was named the "Detroit Special" in honor of the city in which it was built.  The vehicle was later bought by Harry Hartz, who installed a new Miller engine.  Durant was to have driven the car in the 1932 Indy 500 race, but Fred Frame drove it to victory instead.

Other Racing Accomplishments 
Durant competed at many tracks and events around the country, including: Santa Monica and Corona road races, Tacoma Speedway, Cactus Derby (a challenging off-road race between Los Angeles and Phoenix), and the Indy 500.

In 1923 Durant had the largest stable of cars (6) ever to participate in the Indy 500 until modern times.  He came in 7th that year.

Durant was the financial backer of the famous Harry Miller racing engines, which dominated the racing world in the 1920s–30s.

Other activities
Durant had his own flight school, airplanes for sale, and a  field, "Durant Field" in Oakland, California in 1919.  It was located between 80th Ave., 83rd Ave., and Snell Street.  He also had Air Mail contracts for mail delivery with the government.

In 1921 Durant was a partner with Thomas O'Brian in the Lebec Hotel in the Mountains north of Los Angeles near present day I-5.

He had a large estate in Roscommon, Michigan on the South Branch of the Au Sable River, where "The Castle," a 54-room mansion, burned to the ground February 6, 1931.  On the estate was his own private air strip, with several planes.  On April 25, 1930, test pilot Herbert J. Fahy died two days after an airplane he had been showing Durant had crashed on takeoff at this airstrip.  Herb Fahy and his wife Claire, both prominent pilots, acted as sales agents for Lockheed.  Durant agreed to buy the airplane if the Fahys could prove that the Sirius could land and take off safely from Durant's personal strip.  Herb and Claire Fahy landed the plane without incident, but as they took off, one of the wheels hit a partially hidden stump, which flipped the plane over.  Herb Fahy, at age 33, suffered a fractured skull and a severe concussion from which he never recovered.

The community airport in Roscommon, Michigan, was named Durant Field in his honor on July 16, 1933.

At various times in his career he presided over the West Coast division of Durant Motors, and had been vice president of sales for Chevrolet in Oakland, California.  He left Chevrolet in 1921, after his father, W.C. "Billy" Durant, left General Motors.

Durant was an accomplished musician as well, playing the violin.  He owned the Guarneri del Gesu violin, and played the piano and trumpet.  He was at one time the owner of one of the most prized collections of violins in the world.

In addition to being a businessman, race car driver, aviator and musician, he was also a yachtsman who owned the sailing yacht "Aurora."

Death
Durant died of a heart attack at his Hollywood home on October 31, 1937, aged 46.  His wife, Charlotte Phillips, had summoned medical assistance but he was pronounced dead when the assistance arrived.  He is buried at Forest Lawn Memorial Park in Glendale, California.

Indianapolis 500 results

References

External links
Photo of Durant in airplane

1890 births
1937 deaths
Sportspeople from Flint, Michigan
Racing drivers from Michigan
Racing drivers from California
Indianapolis 500 drivers
AAA Championship Car drivers